John J. Sliter was a member of the Minnesota House of Representatives.

Biography
Sliter was born on August 26, 1873 in Spring Green, Wisconsin. On October 26, 1897, he married Florence Thompson. They would have four children.

Career
Sliter was elected to the House of Representatives in 1914 and re-elected in 1916 and 1918. Additionally, he was a member of the Houston, Minnesota School Board. He was a Republican.

References

People from Spring Green, Wisconsin
People from Houston, Minnesota
Republican Party members of the Minnesota House of Representatives
School board members in Minnesota
1873 births
Year of death missing